The Hollywood Post Alliance Award for Outstanding Editing in a Feature Film is an annual award, given by the Hollywood Post Alliance, or HPA, to post production workers in the film and television industry, in this case film editors. It was first awarded in 2008, and has been presented every year since.

Winners and nominees
 † – indicates the winner of the Academy Award for Best Film Editing.
 ‡ – indicates a nomination for the Academy Award for Best Film Editing.

2000s

2010s

References

Lists of films by award
Film editing awards